Ulyanovka is a rural locality (a village) in Taymasovsky Selsoviet, Kuyurgazinsky District, Bashkortostan, Russia. The population was 9 as of 2010. There is 1 street.

Geography 
Ulyanovka is located 47 km northwest of Yermolayevo (the district's administrative centre) by road. Taymasovo is the nearest rural locality.

References 

Rural localities in Kuyurgazinsky District